English Argentines (also known as Anglo-Argentines) are citizens of Argentina or the children of Argentine citizens brought up in Argentina, who can claim ancestry originating in England. The English settlement in Argentina (the arrival of English emigrants), took place in the period after Argentina's independence from Spain through the 19th century. Unlike many other waves of immigration to Argentina, English immigrants were not usually leaving England because of poverty or persecution, but went to Argentina as industrialists and major landowners.

The United Kingdom had a strong economic influence in Argentina during the Victorian period.
However the position of English Argentines was complicated when their economic influence was finally eroded by Juan Perón's nationalisation of many British-owned companies in the 1940s and then by the Falklands War in 1982. Notable Argentines such as presidents of Argentina Raúl Alfonsín and Carlos Pellegrini, adventurer Lucas Bridges, Huracan football club former player and president Carlos Babington and writer Jorge Luis Borges are partially of English descent.

English immigration
English settlers arrived in Buenos Aires in 1806 (then a Spanish colony) in small numbers, mostly as businessmen, when Argentina was an emerging nation and the settlers were welcomed for the stability they brought to commercial life. As the 19th century progressed more English families arrived, and many bought land to develop the potential of the Argentine pampas for the large-scale growing of crops. The English founded banks, developed the export trade in crops and animal products and imported the luxuries that the growing Argentine middle classes sought.

As well as those who went to Argentina as industrialists and major landowners, others went as railway engineers, civil engineers and to work in banking and commerce. Others went to become whalers, missionaries and simply to seek out a future. English families sent second and younger sons, or what were described as the black sheep of the family, to Argentina to make their fortunes in cattle and wheat. English settlers introduced football to Argentina. Some English families owned sugar plantations.

Background
In a treaty of 1825, the United Kingdom became one of the first countries to recognise the independence of Argentina. English arrivals and investment played a large part in the development of Argentine railway and tramway lines, and also Argentine agriculture, livestock breeding, processing, refrigeration and export. At one point in the 19th century, ten per cent of British foreign investment was in Argentina, despite not being a colony. In 1939, 39% of investment in Argentina was British.

English culture, or a version of it as perceived from outside, had a noted effect on the culture of Argentina, mainly in the middle classes. In 1888 local Anglo-Argentines established the Hurlingham Club, based on its namesake in London. The city of Hurlingham, Buenos Aires and Hurlingham Partido in Buenos Aires Province later grew up around the club and took their names from it. The Córdoba Athletic Club, one of the oldest sports clubs in Argentina, was founded in 1882 by English men who lived in Córdoba working for the railways.

In 1912 the well-known London department store Harrods opened a store in Buenos Aires; the only Harrods ever opened outside London. Harrods Buenos Aires became independent of Harrods in the 1940s, but still traded under the Harrods name.

Afternoon tea became standard amongst large segments of the population and generated the popular merienda, an afternoon snack also known simply as la leche (milk) because it was served with tea or chocolate milk along with sweets. The Richmond café on Florida Street is a notable tea venue near the Harrods department store, now an exhibition hall.

Gardened chalets built by railway executives near railway stations in suburbs including Banfield, Temperley, Munro, Ranelagh and Hurlingham gave a pointed English atmosphere to local areas in Buenos Aires, especially in winter when shrouded in grey mists and fallen oak leaves over cobblestones. Belgrano R, within the Belgrano district, is another train station known for the British neighbourhood around it originated by the railway. An Anglican church from 1896 and the Buenos Aires English High School founded by Alexander Watson Hutton in 1884 are both in this area. Also important are the railway terminals Retiro in Retiro neighbourhood and Constitución. There are numerous countryside stations in the Pampas.

Around 100,000 Anglo-Argentines are the descendants of English immigrants to Argentina. They are one of the most successful immigrant groups of Argentina, gaining prominence in commerce, industry, and the professions. Many speak unaccented English at home. An English-language newspaper, the Buenos Aires Herald, was published daily in Buenos Aires from 1876 to 2017.

Anglo-Argentines have traditionally differed from their fellow Argentines by largely retaining strong ties with their mother country, including education and commerce. There are many schools in Argentina that are bilingual, offering a British curriculum in English and the standard Argentine curriculum in Spanish, including Northlands School, St. Mark's College, Balmoral College, St. Alban's College, St. George's College, Belgrano Day School and Washington School. Buenos Aires had a number of branches of the Asociación Argentina de Cultura Inglesa (English Cultural Association), and throughout the 20th century English language learning and teaching in state schools and private institutions was invariably geared towards the Received Pronunciation. Many private boys' schools have a uniform of blue blazers and grey flannel trousers.

The Anglo-Argentine Society, based in London, was founded in 1948 and has about 900 members. It is a society for Argentine people living in the United Kingdom, particularly those of Anglo-Argentine heritage. One of its main aims is to promote understanding and friendship between the two countries. Also in London is the Canning Club, formerly the Argentine Club until Juan Perón nationalised Argentine-based British businesses, the main source of revenue of the club in the 1940s. The club is for those with a particular link to, or special interest in, Argentina and other Latin American countries.

The Coghlan neighbourhood in Buenos Aires, known for its large English-style residences, was originally inhabited by English and Irish immigrants. Caballito contains an area called the "English District".

In 1794, the British Empire opened a consulate in San Nicolás, leading to the development of a large British community in the area, which became known as the "English borough". They founded the English Merchants' Society in 1810 and in 1822 the British Consulate became home to the first modern bank in Buenos Aires.

World War II

During World War II, 4,000 Argentines served with all three British armed services, even though Argentina was officially a neutral country during the war. Over 600 Argentine volunteers served with both the Royal Air Force and the Royal Canadian Air Force, mostly in the 164 Argentine-British RAF squadron, whose shield bore the sun from the flag of Argentina and the motto, "Determined We Fly (Firmes Volamos)". Many members of the Anglo-Argentine community also volunteered in non-combat roles, or worked to raise money and supplies for British troops. In April 2005, a special remembrance service was held at the RAF church of St Clement Danes in London.

Nearly 500 Argentines served in the Royal Navy around the world, from the North Atlantic to the South Pacific. Many were part of the special forces, such as John Godwin.

Falklands War

When considering the British response to the Argentine landing on the Falkland Islands in 1982, at the start of the Falklands War, the British Prime Minister, Margaret Thatcher, was advised of the potential risk that a military response might pose to Anglo-Argentines. However, the risk did not materialise and people with a British background were not endangered. Diplomatic relations between the two countries were broken off that year, and were normalised in 1990.

English place names

A number of towns, villages and cities have English place names. These include Banfield which is named after Edward Banfield. Wilde, Buenos Aires, named in 1888 by Eduardo Wilde in honour of his uncle Dr. José Antonio Wilde, who was an English Argentine. Hurlingham, Buenos Aires and Hurlingham Partido took their name from the Hurlingham Club around which the city of Hurlingham grew. Others include the town of Lincoln, Washington and City Bell, a small town in La Plata partido, Buenos Aires province, which was founded around 1900 by English immigrants and which is named after its founder, George Bell. Temperley is named after the industrial and textile merchant George Temperley, who was born in 1823 in Newcastle upon Tyne in England. He helped to create Lomas de Zamora Partido and made possible the foundation of the town of Temperley. Allen, Río Negro is named after Charles Allen who managed the construction of the city's train station.

There are several train station-founded towns with English names in the country such as Roberts, Smith, Hereford and Henderson. The station of Monte Coman in Mendoza Province owes its name to a dispute with a British company which did not pay its local workers on time. The workers complained they had nothing to eat; an engineer responded, in bad Spanish, "coman monte" which was supposed to mean "eat the woods". In Córdoba province, English names can be traced in Morrison or James Craik, as well as Armstrong in Santa Fe province. 

The Torre de los Ingleses ('Tower of the English') in Buenos Aires was renamed the Torre Monumental following the Falklands War.

English colonies in Argentina
The city of Villa María in Córdoba Province was co-founded by English families.

Sport

Sports such as football, tennis, rugby union, hockey, golf, cricket, and polo were introduced to Argentina by English settlers.

Polo

Polo was first played in Argentina at the Hurlingham Club and the Argentine Polo Association was founded at the club in 1922. Argentina has since become a dominant power in international polo, and the Campeonato Argentino Abierto de Polo has been held annually since 1893 at the Campo Argentino de Polo in Buenos Aires.

Football

English railway workers from Northern England founded the Buenos Aires Football Club on 9 May 1867 in Temple Street (now Viamonte) at a meeting organised by brothers Thomas and James Hogg who were originally from Yorkshire. The first football match to be played in Argentina was played at the Buenos Aires Cricket Club in Palermo, Buenos Aires on 20 June 1867. The match was played between two teams of British merchants, the White Caps and the Red Caps.

Alumni Athletic Club was founded in 1898 as "English High School" (taking the name of the school where the team came from, and the club was the most successful during the first years of football in Argentina. The team debuted in the inaugural season of the recently formed Argentine Football Association in 1893 and played again in 1895 and 1900 under its original name. In 1901 they changed their name to "Alumni". They continued to play in the league until the club were disbanded in 1911.

British football clubs tours over South America contributed to the spread and develop of football in the region during the first years of the 20th century. The first club to tour on the region was Southampton F.C. in 1904, followed by several teams (mainly from England although some Scotland clubs also visited South America) until 1929 with Chelsea F.C. being the last team to tour.

British teams were considered the best in the world by then, and some of them served as inspiration to establish football clubs in Argentina, helped by the immigration of British citizens that had arrived to work for British companies (mostly in railway construction). Clubs founded by English railway workers were Ferrocarril Midland (Buenos Aires Midland Railway, Ferro Carril Oeste (Buenos Aires Western Railway) and Talleres de Córdoba (Córdoba Central Railway), Rosario Central (originally "Central Argentine Railway Athletic Club" by Central Argentine Railway workers).

Further examples of clubs established by British immigrants to South America are Belgrano A.C., Rosario A.C., Alumni and Quilmes.

Evidence of the influence of English settlers in Argentine football can be seen by club names, and the tradition of giving clubs English names although they were not founded by British immigrants. Some examples are Boca Juniors, River Plate, All Boys, Racing Club, Chaco For Ever.

Religion
The majority of Argentines of English descent who claim a religion are Catholic rather than mainly Protestant denominations which predominate in England due to conversion or intermarriage with non-English Argentines. The Anglican Church of South America claims a membership of roughly 25,000, mostly living in Argentina, but including members in neighbouring countries.

Anglican church in Argentina
Anglican churches were established in Argentina, where the religion is otherwise overwhelmingly Catholic, in the early 19th century to give a chaplaincy service to expatriate workers living in Argentina. In 1824 permission was given to hold Anglican church services, and in 1831 St. John's Church was built in San Nicolás, Buenos Aires on land donated in 1830 by Governor Juan Manuel de Rosas for the benefit of the new St. John the Baptist Anglican Church. It is the oldest in existence in Buenos Aires.

English naval captain and Christian missionary, Allen Gardiner founded the Patagonia Mission (later renamed the South American Missionary Society) in 1844 to recruit, send, and support Protestant Christian missionaries. His first mission, which included a surgeon and three fishermen was sent to the Yaghans on the island of Isla Grande de Tierra del Fuego. They arrived at Picton island in Tierra del Fuego in December 1850, but their food began to run out; the supplies they had expected did not arrive, and by September 1851 they had died from sickness and hunger. The Patagonia Mission continued and in 1854 changed its name to the South American Missionary Society.

In January 1869 the Society established a mission at Ushuaia in Tierra del Fuego under its superintendent, Waite Hockin Stirling. On 21 December 1869 Stirling was ordained at Westminster Abbey as the first Bishop of the Falkland Islands and at the time had episcopal authority over the whole of South America, until power was transferred to the Bishop of Buenos Aires. In 1914 the first mission, Misión Chaqueña, was founded in the north of Argentina.

The Anglican Diocese of Argentina is part of the Anglican Province of the Southern Cone of America and is headed by the current bishop of Buenos Aires.

Notable people

Carlos Babington – former footballer. Known as "El Inglés" (The Englishman).
Hilda Bernard – actress.
Jorge Luis Borges – author and poet; his grandmother was of English origin.
Eduardo Bradley – aviator.
Lucas Bridges – author and explorer.
Hector Cuper – football manager.
Rodolfo Enrique Fogwill – author and sociologist.
Donald Forrester – cricketer.
John Godwin – sub-Lieutenant in the British Royal Naval Reserve in World War II. Joined 14 (Arctic) Commando and was lost on Operation Checkpoint.
Andrew Graham-Yooll – author, worked for Perfil.
Trevor Grove – journalist and newspaper editor.
Soto Grimshaw – naturalist and explorer.
Diego Hartfield – tennis player.
Juan Enrique Hayes – football player.
Leonardo Henrichsen – photojournalist.
Mariano Hood – tennis player.
Juan Carlos Howard – tango pianist and composer.
William Henry Hudson – author and naturalist.
Martita Hunt – actress.
Olivia Hussey – actress best known for her role as Juliet in Franco Zeffirelli's 1968 film version of Romeo and Juliet.
Lewis Lacey – polo player who was Argentina's second 10-goal player.
Roberto M. Levingston – Argentina President June 18, 1970 – March 21, 1971
Francisco Moreno – explorer and geographer. His mother, Juana Thwaites, was of English descent.
Isaac Newell – founder or Newell's Old Boys football club.
Olga Casares Pearson – actress.
Carlos Pellegrini – President of Argentina from 6 August 1890 to 12 October 1892. His mother, María Bevans Bright, was of English origin.
Julio Porter – screenwriter and film director, known for being one of the most prolific screenwriters and film directors in the history of the Cinema of Argentina.
Peter Prescott (barrister) – Queen's Counsel.
Jorge Pullin – physicist.
Anya Taylor-Joy – actress.
Collier Twentyman Smithers –  portrait, figure and rustic painter.
René Strickler – actor.
Martín Jacobo Thompson – navy officer and patriot, founder of the Argentine Naval Prefecture.
Maria Elena Walsh – children's literature writer and singer.
Eduardo Wilde – physician, politician and writer.
Amancio Williams – architect.
Elena Roger – actress.
Carlos Micháns – composer and writer.

Gallery

See also

 Football in Argentina
 Buenos Aires English High School
 Alumni Athletic Club
 British football clubs tours to South America

References

External links
Anglo-Argentine Society website
Immigration to Argentina-Report-Yale
ABCC – Argentine British Community Council

British Argentine
Argentine
Immigration to Argentina